Seaman Reservoir is located  northwest of Fort Collins, Colorado up the Poudre Canyon. It is also called the Gateway Natural Area.

The Seaman Reservoir Trail is 1.0 mile long in one direction and has almost zero elevation gain.

References

Reservoirs in Colorado
Protected areas of Larimer County, Colorado
Lakes of Larimer County, Colorado